Kamaladinni is a village in Belagavi district in Karnataka, India. having one govt primary school and other aided mahatma Gandhi school in kamaladinni

References

Villages in Belagavi district